The Cathedral of the Holy Cross and Saint Eulalia, also known as Barcelona Cathedral, is the Gothic cathedral and seat of the Archbishop of Barcelona, Catalonia, Spain. The cathedral was constructed from the thirteenth to fifteenth centuries, with the principal work done in the fourteenth century. The cloister, which encloses the Well of the Geese (Font de les Oques), was completed in 1448. In the late nineteenth century, the neo-Gothic façade was constructed over the nondescript exterior that was common to Catalan churches. The roof is notable for its gargoyles, featuring a wide range of animals, both domestic and mythical.

Its form is pseudo-basilica, vaulted over five aisles, the outer two divided into chapels. The transept is truncated. The east end is a chevet of nine radiating chapels connected by an ambulatory. The high altar is raised, allowing a clear view into the crypt.

The cathedral is dedicated to Eulalia of Barcelona, co-patron saint of Barcelona, a young virgin who, according to Catholic tradition, suffered martyrdom during Roman times in the city. One story says that she was exposed naked in the public square and a miraculous snowfall in mid-spring covered her nudity. The enraged Romans put her into a barrel with knives stuck into it and rolled it down a street (according to tradition, the one now called Baixada de Santa Eulàlia). The body of Saint Eulalia is entombed in the cathedral's crypt.

The choir stalls retain the coats-of-arms of the knights of the Order of the Golden Fleece. In his first trip into Spain, Charles, the future Holy Roman Emperor, selected Barcelona as the site of a chapter of his Order. The king had arrived for his investiture as Count of Barcelona, and the city, as a Mediterranean port, offered the closest communication with other far-flung Habsburg dominions, while the large proportions of the cathedral would accommodate required grand ceremonies. In 1518 the Order's herald, Thomas Isaac, and its treasurer, Jean Micault, were commissioned to prepare the sanctuary for the first sitting of the chapter in 1519. Juan de Borgonya executed the painted decoration of the sanctuary.

"The church was named after Barcelona's patron saint Eulalia; its official name - Catedral de la Santa Creu i Santa Eulàlia - is Catalan for "Cathedral of the Holy Cross and Saint Eulalia". The commonly used name La Seu refers to the status of the church as the seat of the diocese."

The side Chapel of the Holy Sacrament and of the Holy Christ of Lepanto contains a cross said to date from the time of the Battle of Lepanto (1571).

In addition to Saints Eulàlia and Olegarius, the cathedral contains the tombs of Saint Raymond of Penyafort, Count Ramon Berenguer I and his third wife Almodis de la Marche, and bishops Berenguer de Palou II, Salvador Casañas y Pagés, and Arnau de Gurb, who is buried in the Chapel of Santa Llúcia, which he had constructed.

The cathedral has a secluded Gothic cloister where 13 white geese are kept, the number explained by the assertion that Eulalia was 13 when she was martyred.

A program of cleaning and restoration of the cathedral was carried out from 1968 to 1972.

History
Parts of an early Christian and Visigothic episcopal complex including the baptistery (fourth century), a basilical hall (fifth century), a cross shaped church (sixth-seventh century) and bishop's palace (sixth-seventh century) are displayed in Barcelona City History Museum archaeological underground.  Reportedly, this Visigothic chapel was dedicated to Saint James, and was the proprietary church of the Viscounts of Barcelona.  However, in a document from the Second Council of Barcelona in 599, it states that the cathedral was dedicated to the Holy Cross. This church was severely damaged by al-Mansur (Almanzor) during his attack on Barcelona in 985.

In 1046, Count Ramon Berenguer I and his wife Almodis, together with Bishop Guislabert, began construction of a Romanesque cathedral at the site; it was consecrated in November 1058. The cathedral was constructed over the crypt of the former church.  It has been reported that a Viscount of Barcelona, Mir Geribert, sold the site to Bishop Guislebert in 1058, though however, this date does not coincide with the reported start of construction.

The present Gothic cathedral was begun on the foundations of the previous churches on 1 May 1298; James II the Just was King of Aragon at the time, and Bernat Pelegri was Bishop of Barcelona. The church was built from the east end towards the west end, with a simple west facade completed in 1417.  The cloister was completed in 1448, making the total duration of construction 150 years.  In the late nineteenth century, Miguel Girona i Agrafel offered to complete the neo-Gothic facade and central tower as inspired by the original fifteenth-century design prepared by master Carlí and rearranged and drawn by the architect Josep O. Mestres. This work was completed in 1913 by Girona's children.

Chapel of Lepanto
The Chapel of the Holy Sacrament and of the Holy Christ of Lepanto is a small side chapel constructed by Arnau Bargués in 1407, as the chapterhouse. It was rebuilt in the seventeenth century to house the tomb of San Olegarius, Bishop of Barcelona, and Archbishop of Tarragona.

The "Holy Christ of Lepanto" crucifix, is located on the upper part of the chapel entrance's front façade. The curved shape of the body, of Our Lord Jesus Christ on the Cross, is explained by a Catalan legend which holds that the cross was carried on the prow of the galley captained by Juan of Austria, step-brother of Spanish Philip II of Spain during the Battle of Lepanto in 1571. When a cannonball flew toward the cross, it leaned out of the way in order to avoid being hit, and has been inclined ever since. The Habsburgs were said to have regarded this as an encouraging omen.

A separate story says that the cross was in the ship's hold and that the figure moved to cover a large hole that would have sunk the ship.

Traditions 
 The tradition of the 'dancing egg' (supported by the jet of a fountain) is maintained on the day of Corpus Christi at the cathedral.

Present day 
The cathedral has been updated in response to an increasing number of tourists. The cloister now contains a gift shop, the traditional candles normally lit at the shrines of saints have been replaced with electronic candles, and cellular phones have been banned from the Chapel of Lepanto and other chapels.

Images

See also 
 Catholic Church in Spain
List of Gothic Cathedrals in Europe

References

External links 

Official site
Legends of Saint Eulalia. Martyrdom, Burial in Cathedral Crypt, Why it always rains during Barcelona Festival

14th-century Roman Catholic church buildings in Spain
Roman Catholic churches completed in 1417
Gothic architecture in Barcelona
Roman Catholic cathedrals in Catalonia
Tourist attractions in Barcelona
Ciutat Vella
Basilica churches in Spain
Roman Catholic churches in Barcelona
Burial sites of the House of Barcelona